HMS Leeds Castle (P258) was  a  built by Hall, Russell & Company of Aberdeen, Scotland for the Royal Navy. She was launched in October 1980 and commissioned the following August. She was involved in the 1982 Falklands War, operating between the British territories of Ascension Island, South Georgia, and the Falkland Islands as a dispatch vessel commanded by Lieutenant-Commander Colin Hamilton.

The Leeds Castle spent much time performing fishery protection duties around the United Kingdom, as well as being used as a guard ship in the Falkland Islands. In 2000, Leeds Castle underwent an eight-month refit, returning to the fleet in early 2001.

Design and construction
The  was designed for fisheries protection and oilfield patrol duties in the United Kingdom's exclusive economic zone (EEZ).

Displacement was  standard and  full load.

The ship was initially armed with a single Bofors 40 mm L/60 gun, although by 1990 this had been replaced by an Oerlikon 30 mm gun on a DS30B mount. The main armament was supplemented by two 7.62 mm machine guns. A large helicopter deck was fitted aft, suitable for landing a Sea King or Chinook helicopter, but no hangar was provided, as the cost of a permanently embarked helicopter would be more than the cost of the ship.  She was fitted with Type 1006 navigation radar, which was supplemented with a Type 994 air/surface search radar in 1989, together with a UAN(1) electronic intercept system (based on the Orange Crop system fitted to the Royal Navy's helicopters. The ship had a crew of 6 officers and 39 other ranks, with room for a 25-man detachment of Royal Marines to be carried.

Leeds Castle was laid down at Hall, Russell & Company's Aberdeen shipyard as Yard number 985 on 18 October 1979 as the first of two Castle-class patrol vessels. This was in advance of a formal order for the two ships being placed, which did not take place until 8 August that year. She was launched on 22 October 1980, and was completed in December 1981.

Service
After commissioning and workup, Leeds Castle, assigned the pennant number P258, started fishery protection patrols around Shetland and in the English Channel in March 1982. On 2 April 1982, the Falklands War began when Argentine forces invaded the Falkland Islands. Leeds Castle was diverted from her normal North Sea patrol duties on 22 April, being fitted additional communications equipment and a desalination plant at HMNB Portsmouth before setting out for the Falklands on 29 April. She arrived in the Total Exclusion Zone on 21 May where she was employed as a despatch vessel, duties including acting as a refuelling platform for helicopters transferring stores between the transports ,  and  near South Georgia on 27 May. She was then ordered to  Ascension Island to serve as guardship, arriving there on 6 June 1982, before setting out again for the Falklands on 29 June, arriving at Port Stanley on 12 July. She set out on her return journey to the Britain on 24 July, arriving back at her home port of Rosyth on 20 August 1982.

In 1983, Leeds Castle took part in minelaying trials.

The ship was decommissioned in 2005 after a 24-year career having finished her final deployment as a patrol vessel based in the Falkland Islands. She was relieved in that role in 2004, returning to the UK in November.

Sale to Bangladesh
In April 2010 Leeds Castle was sold to Bangladesh along with Dumbarton Castle. The two ships were refitted at the A&P Group facility in Newcastle upon Tyne before being handed over.

Notes

References

 .

Castle-class patrol vessels
Falklands War naval ships of the United Kingdom
1980 ships
Ships built by Hall, Russell & Company